David Marshall Long (October 23, 1936 – December 19, 2018) was an American politician in the state of Kentucky.

Biography
Marshall was born in Louisville, Kentucky. He served in the United States Air Force and was commissioned a captain. Marshall received his bachelor's degree from Centre College in 1959. He lived in Shelbyville, Kentucky and was in the real estate business. Long served as mayor of Shelbyville from 1972 to 1981. He served in the Kentucky House of Representatives from 1982 to 1998 and the  Kentucky Senate from 1998 to 2002, as a Democrat. Long died on December 19, 2018.

References

1936 births
2018 deaths
Mayors of places in Kentucky
Democratic Party members of the Kentucky House of Representatives
Democratic Party Kentucky state senators
Military personnel from Louisville, Kentucky
Politicians from Louisville, Kentucky
People from Shelbyville, Kentucky
Businesspeople from Louisville, Kentucky
20th-century American businesspeople